Kjell-Rune "Mille" Milton (born May 26, 1948) is a Swedish former professional ice hockey defenceman.

He competed as a member of the Sweden men's national ice hockey team at the 1972 Winter Olympics held in Japan.

References

External links

1948 births
Living people
Frölunda HC players
Kölner Haie players
Modo Hockey players
Swedish ice hockey defencemen
Olympic ice hockey players of Sweden
Ice hockey players at the 1972 Winter Olympics
Sportspeople from Umeå